Stanley George Wojcicki (born Stanisław Jerzy Wójcicki, ; March 30, 1937) is a Polish American professor emeritus and former chair of the physics department at Stanford University in California, United States.

Early life and education
Wojcicki was born in Warsaw, Poland, the son of Janina Wanda Wójcicka (née Kozłowska), a bibliographer, and Franciszek Wójcicki, a lawyer. He and his brother fled from Poland to Sweden with his mother at the age of 12, when communists came to power. They eventually arrived in the United States. His father remained in Poland, and was soon imprisoned for five years for being a member of the government's main opposition party. He was never able to gain a visa to come to the United States.

Wojcicki and his brother were sent to a boarding school run by the Franciscan order near Buffalo, New York. He excelled in mathematics and had thought of pursuing either engineering or medicine, but decided to study physics. He attended Harvard University on a scholarship and graduated with an AB. He later attended University of California, Berkeley where he earned a PhD.

Career
Wojcicki worked at the Lawrence Berkeley National Laboratory and was a National Science Foundation fellow at CERN and the Collège de France. In 1966, he joined the Stanford University physics faculty where he headed the Department of Physics from 1982–1985 and 2004–2007.

Wojcicki has served as an advisor to government funding agencies (US and foreign) as well as to several high energy physics laboratories. He also headed the High Energy Physics Advisory Panel, which advises the United States Department of Energy and the National Science Foundation on particle physics matters.

Wojcicki led the HEPAP subpanel New Facilities for the US High-Energy Physics Program which recommended building the Super Conducting Super Collilder in 1983.

Personal life
Stanley Wojcicki is the husband of fellow educator Esther Wojcicki, whom he met at UC Berkeley. They have three children and nine grandchildren.
Susan Wojcicki, former CEO of YouTube. Google's first office was started in her home.
Janet Wojcicki, assistant professor of pediatrics at UCSF.
Anne Wojcicki, founder and CEO of the genetic testing company 23andMe

In 2010, his daughter Anne and her then-husband, Google co-founder Sergey Brin, endowed a $2.5 million chair in experimental physics at Stanford in her father's name.

References

External links
Scientific publications of Stanley Wojcicki on INSPIRE-HEP

Living people
21st-century American physicists
People associated with CERN
Polish emigrants to the United States
Harvard University alumni
Stanford University Department of Physics faculty
UC Berkeley College of Engineering alumni
1937 births
Fellows of the American Physical Society
Scientists from Buffalo, New York
Winners of the Panofsky Prize
People from Warsaw